The Residences Providence (formerly The Residences at the Westin) is a high-rise residential tower in downtown Providence, Rhode Island, designed by TRO Jung Brannen and developed by The Procaccianti Group. It is situated adjacent to the Omni Providence Hotel, a 25-floor hotel with similar fenestration and styling. The Residences Providence is slightly taller than its counterpart, rising an additional . The lower floors are an extension of the hotel. Floors 16-31 consist of high-end condominiums. The Residences Providence is one of several high-rise residential projects in Providence completed since 2000 that are aimed at the luxury condominium market. It is the 3rd-tallest building and the tallest residential building in the state.

Gallery

References

External links 
Official site

Skyscrapers in Providence, Rhode Island
Jung Brannen buildings
Condo hotels in the United States
Residential buildings completed in 2007
Residential buildings in Rhode Island
Hotels in Rhode Island
Residential skyscrapers in the United States
2007 establishments in Rhode Island